Dr. Dilip Kumar Jaiswal (born 2 May 1963) is an Indian politician belonging to the Bharatiya Janata Party. He is a member of the Bihar Legislative Council and contested the 2014 Lok Sabha election from Kishanganj. Jaiswal is the current deputy whip of ruling party in Bihar Legislative Council.

He is also the director of Mata Gujri Memorial Medical College, Kishanganj affiliated to Mata Gujri University.

References

Members of the Bihar Legislative Council
National Democratic Alliance candidates in the 2014 Indian general election
People from Kishanganj district
1963 births
Living people
Bharatiya Janata Party politicians from Bihar